Crossings: Electronic Journal of Art and Technology is a peer-reviewed academic journal published by Trinity College Dublin. It publishes papers, commentaries, reviews, response papers, exhibitions, and short descriptions of work in progress discussing art and technology and how the two intersect. It was established in 2001. The editor-in-chief is Mads Haahr (Trinity College Dublin).

The journal is indexed by EBSCO in the database Art & Architecture Complete. and in the H.W. Wilson Art index.

References

External links

Academic journals published by universities and colleges
Arts journals
English-language journals
Publications established in 2001
Trinity College Dublin
Irregular journals